Nakaseke General Hospital, also Nakaseke Hospital, is a public hospital in the Central Region of Uganda.

Location
The hospital is located in the town of Nakaseke, in Nakaseke District,  in the part of the country known as the Luweero Triangle. The coordinates of Nakaseke General Hospital are:0°43'06.0"N, 32°23'56.0"E (Latitude:0.718344; Longitude:32.398893).

Overview
Nakaseke hospital is a rural hospital built in the 1960s by the administration of Prime Minister Milton Obote. It serves Nakaseke District together with some parts of the neighboring districts of Luweero, Wakiso, Nakasongola and Mityana.

During the National Resistance Movement War in the early 1980s, the hospital served as a major health facility for the NRA guerrillas. Dr. Ronald Bata (R.I.P), the then Medical Director of the hospital, was recruited into the guerrilla force and became their chief medical officer.

Renovation
In 2013, the government of Uganda borrowed money from the World Bank to construct and renovate certain hospitals, including Nakaseke General Hospital. The construction contract was awarded to Yanjian Uganda Company Limited, at a contract price of US$5,090,612.33. By November 2015, those renovations were complete. The scope of work involved the following:

1. Build new outpatients department 2. Build new emergency room (casualty department) 3. Build a new building to house diesel generator for electricity 4. Build a placenta disposal pit 5. Build another pit for disposal of bio-medical waste 6. Build six new staff houses 7. Renovate six existing staff residences 8. Build a laundry facility for patients' families 9. Build a kitchen and dining room for patients' families 10. Build ventilated improved pit latrines for patient families and outpatients and 11. Build two new physician residencies.

See also
List of hospitals in Uganda

References

External links 
 Website of Uganda Ministry of Health
 Nakaseke District Information Portal

Hospital buildings completed in 1969
Nakaseke
Nakaseke District
Central Region, Uganda
1969 establishments in Uganda